Tomás Sangio (born 25 May 1942) is a Peruvian basketball player. He competed in the men's tournament at the 1964 Summer Olympics.

References

External links
 

1942 births
Living people
Peruvian men's basketball players
1963 FIBA World Championship players
1967 FIBA World Championship players
Olympic basketball players of Peru
Basketball players at the 1964 Summer Olympics
Place of birth missing (living people)
20th-century Peruvian people